The 1947–48 Bowdoin Polar Bears men's ice hockey season was the 25th season of play for the program but first under the oversight of the NCAA. The Polar Bears represented Bowdoin College and were coached by Daniel MacFayden, in his 2nd season.

Season
Due to weather, games against New Hampshire and Colby were cancelled. Bowdoin finished 4th in the conference standings with a .500 record, however, because they played just 6 games against conference opponents, there was a question as to whether the Polar Bears would be selected to the NEIHL tournament. In the end, Bowdoin was selected to participate with the league's three powerhouses. The Bears played about as well as could be expected but were still woefully outmatched and fell to Boston College and Boston University in successive days by a combined 5–28 margin.

Roster

Standings

Schedule and results

|-
!colspan=12 style=";" | Regular Season

|-
!colspan=12 style=";" | NEIHL Tournament

|-

Scoring statistics

References

Bowdoin Polar Bears men's ice hockey seasons
Bowdoin
Bowdoin
Bowdoin